John Francis Sartorius (fl. 1775-1831), was an English painter of horses, horse-racing and hunting scenes, a member of the celebrated Sartorius family of artists.

Life and work

John Francis was the son of artist John Nott Sartorius and grandson of Francis Sartorius. His younger brother Francis Sartorius Jr. ("the Younger") was a marine artist. He was less successful than his father with regard to the number of his patrons,  though his thorough knowledge of sport is exemplified in his sporting pictures. He first exhibited at the Royal Academy in London in 1802, when he was residing at 17 King Street, Holborn. Afterwards he sent occasional contributions until 1827, the total number of pictures exhibited by him being 16.

Several of his paintings were engraved in The Sporting Magazine but as his father's works were appearing in the same periodical, and John Scott was engraving for both, it is somewhat difficult to differentiate the son's pictures from the father's, particularly as many of the plates were signed 'Sartorius' only. One of the best known of his pictures is 'Coursing in Hatfield Park,' exhibited at the Royal Academy in 1806, and depicting Emily Cecil, Marchioness of Salisbury, who rode daily in the park up to her eighty-sixth year.

References

Further reading

Gilbey, Sir Walter. Animal painters of England from the year 1650, volume 2 (London: Vinton & Co., 1900).

External links
J F Sartorius on Artnet
Works by J F sartorius (Richard Green Fine paintings)
A Race between Hambletonian and Diamond, 25 March 1799 (Oil on canvas)
Four fox hunting scenes
Huntsmen and hounds by the edge of a wood  (oil on canvas - Christie's)
On the scent (Oil on canvas - Christie's)

Equine artists
18th-century English painters
English male painters
19th-century English painters
1759 births
1828 deaths
British people of German descent
19th-century English male artists
18th-century English male artists